Outi Borgenström (formerly Borgenström-Anjala; born 24 January 1956 in Tampere) is a Finnish orienteering competitor. She won the 1979 Individual World Orienteering Championships, and took bronze medal 1974. She is also Relay World Champion, as a member of the Finnish winning team 1978 (silver 1976 and 1981).

Borgenström and orienteer Ari Anjala have a son, Topi Anjala, who is also an orienteer.

See also
 Finnish orienteers
 List of orienteers
 List of orienteering events

References

1956 births
Living people
Sportspeople from Tampere
Finnish orienteers
Female orienteers
Foot orienteers
World Orienteering Championships medalists
20th-century Finnish women
21st-century Finnish women